Richard Colburn (born 25 July 1970) is the drummer of the Scottish indie band Belle & Sebastian. Before he joined Belle & Sebastian, he used to sell pies on match days outside Celtic Park and studied Music Business at Stow College.   

He drummed on early Snow Patrol sessions and is one of the founding members of The Reindeer Section.

Personal life
Colburn is from the Scottish city of Perth. His grandfather was fellow musician Bill Wilkie.

References

Belle and Sebastian members
Scottish drummers
British male drummers
1970 births
Living people
British indie pop musicians
Snow Patrol
Place of birth missing (living people)
Tired Pony members
Musicians from Perth, Scotland
21st-century drummers